Tang Guan Seng is a Singaporean politician. A member of the governing People's Action Party (PAP), he was a Member of the Parliament representing Khe Bong Single Member Constituency (SMC) from 1984 to 1988, Hougang SMC from 1988 to 1991 and Ang Mo Kio Group Representation Constituency (GRC) from 1997 to 2001.

Political career 
At the 1984 Singaporean general election, Tang contested Khe Bong SMC and won the election over Sim Say Chuan of the Barisan Sosialis with 62.53% of the vote.

At the 1988 Singaporean general election, Khe Boon SMC was absorbed in to Toa Payoh GRC and Tang contested the newly created Hougang SMC. He won the election over Lim Chiu Liang of the Workers' Party (WP) with 58.96% of the vote.

At the 1991 Singaporean general election, Tang lost the election to Low Thia Khiang of WP with 47.18% of the vote.

In 1993, when Ong Teng Cheong resigned from PAP to run in the 1993 Singaporean presidential election, Tang replaced Ong as the chairman of PAP's Kim Keat branch, as well as the Kim Keat grassroots adviser.

Tang did not re-contest Hougang SMC in the 1997 Singaporean general election but joined the PAP team in Ang Mo Kio GRC where the team won the election unopposed.

In 2004, Tang was appointed to be the political secretary to Senior Minister Goh Chok Tong.

Personal life 
Tang is married to Tan Soh Nee.

References 

Living people
Singaporean people of Chinese descent
1948 births